Wallis & Edward (in Canada also known as Her Royal Affair) is a 2005 British television film, scripted by Sarah Williams, dramatising the events of the Edward VIII abdication crisis.  It was billed as the first scripted account of the romance between Wallis Simpson and King Edward VIII to view events from Wallis Simpson's point of view. Joely Richardson played Wallis, and Steven Campbell Moore played Edward.

Cast
Joely Richardson - Wallis Simpson
Steven Campbell Moore - Edward VIII
David Westhead - Ernest Simpson, Wallis's second husband 
Richard Johnson - Prime Minister Stanley Baldwin 
Clifford Rose - George V, Edward's father
Margaret Tyzack - Mary of Teck, Edward's mother
Bill Champion - George VI, Edward's brother
Monica Dolan - Elizabeth Bowes-Lyon, Edward's sister-in-law
David Calder - Winston Churchill
Miriam Margolyes - Bessie Merryman, Wallis' aunt
Lisa Kay - Mary Raffray, Ernest Simpson's wife after Wallis
Helena Michell - Thelma Furness, Edward's love interest before Wallis
Simon Hepworth - "Perry" Brownlow, equerry to Edward
Debora Weston - Katherine "Kitty" Rogers, friend of Wallis
Mykolas Dorofejus - Herman Rogers, friend of Wallis

See also
 Bertie and Elizabeth

References

External links

2005 television films
2005 films
British biographical films
British television films
Cultural depictions of the Edward VIII abdication crisis
Cultural depictions of George VI
Cultural depictions of George V
Cultural depictions of Stanley Baldwin
Cultural depictions of Winston Churchill
2000s English-language films
2000s British films